Born-Dorster-Bäk is a river of Saxony-Anhalt, Germany. It flows into the Ohre near Wieglitz.

See also
List of rivers of Saxony-Anhalt

Rivers of Saxony-Anhalt
Rivers of Germany